Santa Maria degli Scalzi or Chiesa degli Scalzi may refer to:
Scalzi (Verona)
Scalzi (Venice)